Periodic elections for the Tasmanian Legislative Council were held on 6 May 2007. The three seats up for election were Montgomery, held by independent MLC Sue Smith; Nelson, held by independent MLC Jim Wilkinson; and Pembroke, held by Labor MLC Allison Ritchie. Montgomery was last contested in 2002, while Nelson and Pembroke were last contested in 2001.

Montgomery
Independent MLC Sue Smith was elected to the Council for the seat of Leven in 1997, and successfully transferred to the new seat of Montgomery in 2002. She was not opposed in this election.

Nelson
Independent MLC Jim Wilkinson first entered the Council as the member for Queenborough in 1995, successfully transferring to Nelson in 2001. His only opponent was Tom Nilsson of the Tasmanian Greens, an anti-population-growth activist.

Pembroke
Labor MLC Allison Ritchie had held Pembroke since defeating independent member Cathy Edwards in 2001, in a result attributed to dissatisfaction with Edwards' dual role as MLC and Mayor of Clarence. On her election Ritchie was the youngest member ever elected to the Legislative Council. In 2007 she faced five opponents. The only other party to endorse a candidate was the Tasmanian Greens, who ran protester and former candidate Neil Smith. The four independents were: Clarence alderman Richard James, a former Liberal and Democrat serial candidate; John Peers, another Clarence alderman; former Clarence alderman David Jackson; and Hobart City Council alderman Marti Zucco.

Ritchie won a majority while there were still three candidates in the count, so a two-party preferred count was not conducted.

|- style="background-color:#E9E9E9"
! colspan="6" align="left"|After distribution of preferences from three excluded candidates

References

2007 elections in Australia
Elections in Tasmania
2000s in Tasmania
May 2007 events in Australia